Akbesia is a monotypic moth genus in the family Sphingidae erected by Walter Rothschild and Karl Jordan in 1903. Its only species, Akbesia davidi, the pistacia hawkmoth, was first described by Charles Oberthür in 1884. It is known from southern Turkey, northern Syria, northern Israel, western Jordan, south-eastern Turkey, north-eastern Iraq, south-eastern Georgia, northern Iran, eastern Afghanistan and Iranian Beluchistan. It may also occur across Azerbaijan, the Alborz Mountains of northern Iran, the Zagros Mountains of western and southern Iran, and northern Afghanistan. It often occurs in large numbers at certain sites in rocky, hilly areas supporting scattered trees and shrubs of Quercus, Olea, Ceratonia and Pistacia.

The wingspan is 60–70 mm. Although the adults do not feed, they will drink water if offered. There are two generations per year in Iran with adults on wing in April and from late July to August. In northern Iraq, adults are on from May to June and in August.

The larvae have been recorded feeding on Pistacia atlantica and terebinth (Pistacia terebinthus). Larvae have also been reared on Cotinus coggygria and Rhus coriaria.

Etymology
The genus is named after the town of Akbez (near Hassa) in Turkey.

Subspecies
Akbesia davidi davidi
Akbesia davidi gandhara de Freina & Geck, 2003 (Afghanistan)

References

Ambulycini
Monotypic moth genera
Moths of Asia
Taxa named by Walter Rothschild
Taxa named by Karl Jordan